John Ray Godfrey is an American former basketball player. He played college basketball for the Abilene Christian Wildcats.

Godfrey attended Aspermont High School in his hometown of Aspermont, Texas. He played for the Wildcats from 1964 to 1968 as a shooting guard. Godfrey was selected as a member of the second-team Division II All-American team in 1967 and the third-team in 1968. He was a three-time member of the All-Southland Conference team and named the Southland Player of the Year in 1968. Godfrey scored 1,467 points during his Wildcats career and ranks 11th in program history.

Godfrey was selected as the 178th overall pick of the 1968 NBA draft by the Los Angeles Lakers. He was also selected by the Houston Mavericks in the first round of the 1968 American Basketball Association (ABA) draft. He was invited to a tryout with the United States basketball team for the 1968 Summer Olympics.

Godfrey worked as a high school coach and administrator for 35 years.

Godfrey was inducted into the Abilene Christian University Sports Hall of Fame in 1989 and the Big Country Athletic Hall of Fame in 2011. His number 14 was retired by the Wildcats men's basketball team in 2018 as the first jersey number retirement by the program.

References

External links
College statistics

Year of birth missing (living people)
Living people
Abilene Christian Wildcats men's basketball players
American men's basketball players
Basketball players from Texas
Los Angeles Lakers draft picks
People from Stonewall County, Texas
Shooting guards